Katie Clark (born 23 March 1994) is a competitor in synchronized swimming who represented Great Britain in the team event at the 2012 London Olympics.

Clark was selected as a member of the Great Britain duet competing in the 2016 Summer Olympics in Rio de Janeiro, Brazil.

References 

1994 births
Living people
British synchronised swimmers
Olympic synchronised swimmers of Great Britain
Synchronized swimmers at the 2012 Summer Olympics
Synchronized swimmers at the 2016 Summer Olympics
Sportspeople from Reading, Berkshire